The 1964 Republican National Convention took place in the Cow Palace, Daly City, California, from July 13 to July 16, 1964. Before 1964, there had been only one national Republican convention on the West Coast, the 1956 Republican National Convention, which also took place in the Cow Palace. Many believed that a convention at San Francisco indicated the rising power of the Republican Party in the west.

Political context 
The Republican primaries of 1964 featured liberal Nelson Rockefeller of New York and conservative Barry Goldwater of Arizona as the two leading candidates. Shortly before the California primary, Rockefeller's wife, whom he had married the previous year after divorcing his first wife, gave birth. This event drew renewed attention to Rockefeller's family life, which hurt his popularity among conservatives. Rockefeller's divorce and remarriage were viewed by many observers as helping Goldwater win the primary. An anti-Goldwater organization called for the nomination of Governor William Scranton of Pennsylvania, but the effort failed. Although former President Dwight Eisenhower only reluctantly supported Goldwater after he won the nomination, former President Herbert Hoover gave him enthusiastic endorsement. By the end of the primaries, Goldwater's nomination was secure.

Senator Margaret Chase Smith's name was entered for nomination at the convention, the first time a woman's name was entered for nomination at a major party convention.

The convention 

The Republican National Convention of 1964 was a tension-filled contest. Goldwater's conservatives were openly clashing with Rockefeller's moderates. Goldwater was regarded as the "conservatives' leading spokesman." As a result, Goldwater was not as popular with the moderates and liberals of the Republican Party. When Rockefeller attempted to deliver a speech, he was booed by the convention's conservative delegates, who regarded him as a member of the "eastern liberal establishment." Despite the infighting, Goldwater was easily nominated. He chose William E. Miller, a Representative from New York and former chair of the Republican National Committee, as his running mate. In his acceptance speech, he declared communism as a "principal disturber of the peace in the world today" and said, "I would remind you that extremism in the defense of liberty is no vice. And let me remind you also that moderation in the pursuit of justice is no virtue." Some people, including those within his own campaign staff, believed this weakened Goldwater's chances, as he effectively severed ties with the moderates and liberals of the Republican Party.

Former vice president and GOP presidential nominee (and future President) Richard Nixon introduced Goldwater as "Mr. Conservative" and "Mr. Republican" and continued that "he is the man who, after the greatest campaign in history, will be Mr. President — Barry Goldwater". 1964 was the only Republican convention between 1952 and 1972 that did not result in Nixon being nominated for president or vice-president.

As delegates celebrated Goldwater's nomination, Republican officials attempted to clear reporters from the convention floor. NBC reporter John Chancellor refused to leave and was escorted from the convention by police officers, leading to his famous signoff, "This is John Chancellor, somewhere in custody!" According to Emmy award-winning television journalist, Belva Davis, she and another black reporter were chased out of the convention by attendees yelling racial slurs.

The newly opened San Francisco Hilton served as the headquarters of the convention.

Platform 

The 1964 Republican Platform was dominated by Goldwater conservatives, which meant the platform was dominated by calls for limited government, condemnations of the Kennedy and Johnson foreign and domestic policy, calls for more open space for free enterprise, a hard-line against Communist North Vietnam, calls for reform of the United Nations, a staunch support of NATO, calls for lower taxes, a hard line against international Communism, and an accusation that the Kennedy Administration was guilty of Munich-like appeasement for having opened a hotline with the Soviet Union and not with American allies.

Candidates for the nomination

Balloting 
The roll call vote of the states was as follows, as reported by the New York Times:

Presidential 
 Barry Goldwater 883
 William Scranton 214
 Nelson Rockefeller 114
 George Romney 41
 Margaret Chase Smith 27
 Walter Judd 22
 Hiram Fong 5
 Henry Cabot Lodge, Jr. 2

Vice Presidential 
William E. Miller, a Representative from Western New York who had served as Chairman of the Republican National Committee since 1961, was nominated unanimously on a roll call vote. Goldwater stated that he chose Miller to be his running mate simply because "he drives Johnson nuts" with his Republican activism. But by some other accounts, Johnson "was barely aware of Miller's existence." Miller's Eastern roots and Catholic faith balanced the ticket in some ways, however ideologically he was conservative like Goldwater. His relative obscurity—"he was better known for snipes at President Kennedy than for anything else"—gave birth to the refrain "Here's a riddle, it's a killer / Who the hell is William Miller?"

He was replaced as Chairman of the RNC by Dean Burch, a Goldwater loyalist from Arizona.

See also 
 History of the United States Republican Party
 List of Republican National Conventions
 U.S. presidential nomination convention
 1964 Democratic National Convention
 1964 United States presidential election
 Barry Goldwater presidential campaign, 1964

References

External links 

 Republican Party platform of 1964 at The American Presidency Project
 Goldwater nomination acceptance speech for President at RNC (transcript) at The American Presidency Project
 1964 Republican National Convention at Smithsonian Magazine
 Video of Goldwater nomination acceptance speech for President at RNC from C-SPAN (via YouTube) 
 Audio of Goldwater nomination acceptance speech for President at RNC

Republican National Convention
Republican National Convention
Republican National Convention
Civil rights movement
Republican National Convention
Political conventions in California
Political events in the San Francisco Bay Area
Republican National Conventions
Republican Party (United States) events in California
Republican National Convention
Daly City, California